Francesco Saverio Venditti (born 27 August 1976) is an Italian actor and voice actor.

Biography 
Born in Rome to singer-songwriter Antonello Venditti and actress Simona Izzo, Venditti made his acting debut on television as a child in 1985 and made his first film appearance in the 1995 film Strangled Lives directed by his stepfather Ricky Tognazzi. He then appeared in a 1995 TV film directed by Paolo Poeti.

Venditti generally made appearances in fiction stories on television, such as Caro maestro as well as Una donna per amico and Lo zio d'America. He also starred as the young Nicola Catania in the television movie The Good Pope: Pope John XXIII.

As a voice actor, Venditti performed the Italian voice of Ryan Reynolds and Nicholas Hoult as Deadpool and Beast respectively in the X-Men film franchise. Other actors he occasionally dubs includes Michael Peña, Giovanni Ribisi, Justin Long, Diego Luna and David Dastmalchian. In his animated roles, he voiced Oliver in the Italian-Language dub of Oliver & Company.

Personal life 
From Venditti's marriage to screenwriter Alexandra La Capria, he had two children, Alice and Tomaso. He also has another two children, Leonardo and Mia, from his second wife Cristina Congiunti.

Filmography

Cinema 
Strangled Lives (1995)
Bedrooms (1997)
Cuori perduti (1997)
The Sky in a Room (1999)
Almost Blue (2000)
Sottovento! (2001)
Commedia sexy (2001)
Tornare indietro (2001)
Quartetto (2001)
I giorni dell'amore e dell'odio (2001)
Fate come noi (2001)
Io no (2003)
Romanzo Criminale (2005)
Gas (2005)
Il punto rosso (2006)
Il monastero (2008)
Polvere (2009)
Sleepless (2009)
Ganja Fiction (2009)
The Last 56 Hours (2009)
Cinque (2009)
The Museum of Wonders (2010)
Alien Exorcism (2011)

Television 
Un ponte per Terabithia (1985)
Compagni di branco (1996)
Caro maestro (1997)
Amico mio (1998)
Una donna per amico (1998–1999)
Valeria medico legale (2000)
Giornalisti (2000)
Lo zio d'America (2002)
Inferno Below (2003) – TV Film
The Good Pope: Pope John XXIII (2003) – TV Film
Nero (2004) – TV Film
Il Grande Torino (2005)
La freccia nera (2006)
Questa è la mia terra (2006)
Eravamo solo mille (2006)
Amore proibito (2007)
Dottor Clown (2008)
Mia madre (2010
Roma nuda (2010)
Vi perdono ma inginocchiatevi (2012)
Il caso Enzo Tortora – Dove eravamo rimasti? (2012)
L'ultimo papa re (2013)

Dubbing roles

Animation 
Oliver in Oliver & Company
Frankie the Frog in Meet the Robinsons
Tito Lopez in Turbo
Jet-Vac in Skylanders Academy
Marm in The Nut Job
Falcon in Avengers Assemble
Linus in Pride
Shawn in Total Drama All-Stars and Pahkitew Island
Kevin Murphy in F Is for Family
Swift Wind in She-Ra and the Princesses of Power
Hawkeye in The Avengers: Earth's Mightiest Heroes

Live action 
Wade Wilson / Deadpool in X-Men Origins: Wolverine
Wade Wilson / Deadpool in Deadpool
Wade Wilson / Deadpool in Deadpool 2
Hank McCoy / Beast in X-Men: Days of Future Past
Hank McCoy / Beast in X-Men: Apocalypse
Rory Adams in Life
Will Jimeno in World Trade Center
Cassian Andor in Rogue One
Parker Selfridge in Avatar
Kurt in Ant-Man
Kurt in Ant-Man and the Wasp
Warren Mears in Buffy the Vampire Slayer
Leo Fitz in Agents of S.H.I.E.L.D.
Davis Bloome in Smallville
Shane Ross in Grey's Anatomy
Ezra Fitzgerald in Pretty Little Liars
Ernest Rodriguez in Lions for Lambs
Javier Suarez in Dirty Dancing: Havana Nights
Alex in He's Just Not That Into You
Ron Stallworth in BlacKkKlansman
Jack Mercer in Four Brothers
C.C. White in Dreamgirls
Nate Cooper in The Devil Wears Prada
Daniel Williams in Bride Wars
Sam Monroe in Life as a House
Henry in Crossroads
Nick Memphis in Shooter
Rick Meade in Mission: Impossible III
Sir Lancelot in Night at the Museum: Secret of the Tomb
Aaron Marker in 12 Monkeys
Pikachu in Pokémon Detective Pikachu

References

External links 

1976 births
Living people
Male actors from Rome
Italian male film actors
Italian male television actors
Italian male voice actors
20th-century Italian male actors
21st-century Italian male actors